Hillel Isaac Steiner  (born 1942) is a Canadian political philosopher and is Emeritus Professor of Political Philosophy at the University of Manchester. He was elected to the Fellowship of the British Academy in 1999.

Work
Steiner's writings are focused on contemporary philosophical work on the conceptual analysis of freedom, rights and justice, and on the relation between moral and economic rationality. His most noted work is An Essay on Rights which won the Political Studies Association's best book prize for 1994. In it, he develops what has since come to be known as a left-libertarian theory of distributive justice. This book brings together Steiner's work on the pure negative conception of liberty, the Will Theory of rights, and a liberal model of exploitation. Embracing the libertarian right of self-ownership, he argues that its consistent universalization requires that individuals be vested with equal rights to negative freedom that are global in scope and that take account of interpersonal inequalities in natural resource values, including those of genetic endowments. He was also the first person to use the term "throffer", which is now used in and beyond political philosophy, in print.

He is a member of the following organisations: American Philosophical Association, Aristotelian Society, Association for Legal and Social Philosophy, Basic Income Earth Network. British Philosophical Association, European Society for the History of Economic Thought, Political Studies Association, Society for Applied Philosophy, and the September Group.

References 

20th-century Canadian philosophers
21st-century Canadian philosophers
British political philosophers
Canadian political philosophers
Political philosophers
Living people
Academics of the University of Manchester
Left-libertarians
1942 births
Libertarian theorists